Time Bandits is an upcoming fantasy adventure television series based on the 1981 film of the same name directed by Terry Gilliam.

Premise
The series is described as a comedic journey through time and space with a ragtag group of thieves and their newest recruit: an eleven-year-old history nerd.

Cast
 Lisa Kudrow as Penelope
 Kal-El Tuck as Kevin
 Charlyne Yi as Judy
 Tadhg Murphy as Alto
 Roger Jean Nsengiyumva as Widgit
 Rune Temte as Bittelig
 Kiera Thompson as Saffron
 Rachel House as Fianna

Production
In July 2018, Apple closed a deal to develop a television series version of the Terry Gilliam film, with Gilliam set to serve as executive producer. Several months later in March, Taika Waititi joined the project, set to co-write and direct the pilot episode. Waititi stated the series would be 10 episodes, and revealed to be a co-writer alongside Iain Morris and Jemaine Clement. Lisa Kudrow was cast for the series.

Production took place in New Zealand in late 2022 and early 2023. The series was shot in Wellington, appearing as New York set in the 1920s when shooting began in October.

References

External links
 

Apple TV+ original programming
American adventure television series
American fantasy television series
English-language television shows
Live action television shows based on films
Television shows filmed in New Zealand
Television series by Anonymous Content
Television series by Media Rights Capital
Television series by Paramount Television
Upcoming television series